The Kleine Plöner See is a lake in Holstein Switzerland in North Germany.

Geography
The lake is owned both by the state of Schleswig-Holstein as well as various private individuals.

The weakly eutrophic lake lies on the River Schwentine, which enters in two places from the Großer Plöner See

West of the Prinzeninsel, through the Rohrdommelbucht and the Mühlensee. 
Through the centre of Plöner, the Schwanensee and the Stadtsee.

See also
List of lakes in Schleswig-Holstein

Sources 
 Muuß, Uwe; Petersen, Marcus and König, Dietrich (1973). Die Binnengewässer Schleswig-Holsteins. 162 pp., numerous photos., Wachholtz-Verlag Neumünster.

External links 
 Environmental report on the Kleiner Plöner See by the state of Schleswig-Holstein 

Ploner See, Kleiner
Plön
LPlonersee, Kleiner